Merajuddin Patel was a politician from the Indian state of Karnataka. He was a two term member M.L.A from Humnabad assembly constituency (1994 and 2004). He served as Minister for Municipal Administration in the J. H. Patel cabinet and as Minister for Animal Husbandry and Wakf in the Dharam Singh cabinet. He was the Janata Dal (Secular) state president at the time of his death and leaves behind a wife and seven daughters.

References

External links 
Merajuddin Patel affidavit

2008 deaths
Karnataka politicians
Janata Dal (Secular) politicians
Janata Dal politicians
1955 births
Karnataka MLAs 1994–1999
Karnataka MLAs 2004–2007